The Flower of the East complex was a €1.7 billion tourism attraction project, begun in 2004 in Kish Island and was expected to be finished by 2010. The project was cancelled in 2007. The complex was to accommodate a luxury hotel. This project was cancelled in 2017.

Development  project
The Flower of the East Development Project was the biggest project on Kish Island in the Persian Gulf. The project was slated to include three hotels, three Residential Areas, Villas and Apartment Complexes, Coffee Shops, Showrooms, Stores, Sports Facilities and a Marina. The project was managed by the German firm FOE Projektgesellschaft mbH.
Flower of the East Kish Development company in which FOE Projektgeselschaft mbH is the 98% share holder, has been registered in Department of Registrar of Companies and Industrial and Intellectual Ownerships of Kish Free Zone Organization and  continues to be active and has received the annual Economy Activity License for 2010 from KFZO and also received the Amendment of the primary Foreign Investment Permission from FIPA on 05/01/2009.

Flower of the East consists of these sub categories:
 Flower of the East Hotel
 Mainland Apartments
 Promenades: Mainland Promenade, Marina Promenade, Gardens, Patio & Restaurants, Shopping malls 
 Marina: Club Village Villas, Club Arcades, Yacht Harbour, Apartments
 Harbour City
 Parc Residences
 Golf Villas & Hotel
 Fallin Waters Golf Club & Residences
 Hotels: Beauty, Spa, Park etc.

Hotel

The Centerpiece of the project is a hotel in the shape of a flower. The tower is a combination of Persian and Modern architecture.
Due to the geographical location of the Flower of the East Hotel, the sunrise would have been seen by the hotel residents. The hotel was to be surrounded by a park.

Marina
The Flower of the East Marina

A Marina Club Village is to be constructed by Flower of the East Hotel:

 Marina Club Village is surrounded by club park. Each garden is modelled Middle East shaped.
 Marina Club Arcade is the central attraction for the fans of water sports.
 The Marina offers a harbour for demanding skipper.

Falling Waters golf club and residences
The golf facilities include an 18-hole championship golf course based on PGA standards and a 9-hole course for beginners.
The properties of Falling Water Residences are between 1500 and 3500 m² and living areas are 430 to 2000 m² that can be designed and furnished according to the taste of the owner.

See also
 Kish Island

External links
Office Responsible, Drees & Sommer
Kish Free Zone Organization
Iran Economics
SkyScraper Life Bulletin

References

Kish Island
Proposed buildings and structures in Iran
Resorts in Iran
Tourism in Iran
Buildings and structures in Hormozgan Province